Mohamed Mokrani (born 31 January 1981) is an Algerian handball player for Dunkerque.

He competed for the Algerian national team at the 2015 World Men's Handball Championship in Qatar.

He also participated at the 2011 and 2013 World Championships.

References

1981 births
Living people
Algerian male handball players
People from Ivry-sur-Seine
French sportspeople of Algerian descent